Nahr-e Abu Felfel (also Romanized as Nahr-e Abū Felfel; also known as Abū Felfel and Farkand) is a village in Nasar Rural District, Arvandkenar District, Abadan County, Khuzestan Province, Iran. At the 2006 census, its population was 532, in 113 families.

References 

Populated places in Abadan County